Mount Kendrick is a massive ice-covered mountain,  high, surmounting the east side of the Nilsen Plateau at the head of Bartlett Glacier, in the Queen Maud Mountains of Antarctica. It was named by the Advisory Committee on Antarctic Names for Captain H.E. Kendrick, Operations Officer on the staff of the Commander, U.S. Naval Support Force, Antarctica, in U.S. Navy Operation Deep Freeze 1967.

References

Mountains of the Ross Dependency
Amundsen Coast